Oceanic: Remixes & Reinterpretations is a 2004 compilation of remixes by various artists of songs from Isis' 2002 album Oceanic. The album was initially released across a series of four 12" vinyl EPs earlier in 2004; Robotic Empire, the label in control of those original vinyl releases, made available a compilation of all four vinyl EPs in one set on July 19, 2006.

Frontman Aaron Turner has stated that he was surprised by the response of the collaborators; having expected half of those contacted by the band to respond, all but two provided material for the series. The stated intent of the project was to allow further exploration of the ambient, electronic and abstract side of Isis, but to delegate it to the “more capable hands” of musicians outside the band whose work Isis admired.

Disc two's version of Tim Hecker's "Carry" interpretation - titled "Carry (Second Version)" - did not appear on the original Oceanic Remixes LPs and is exclusive to the Remixes/Reinterpretations compilation.

Reception

In reviewing, Patrick Slevin of the Aquarian Weekly gave an effusive verdict, commanding that “everyone else should buy Oceanic first, then buy this.” He argues that Remixes “respects the overall spirit and feel of Oceanic, moving into each song with care and deliberate attention, which makes [it] just as pleasing, stimulating and soothing to listen to as its parent recording.” Pitchfork Media's Brandon Stosuy felt that not all Isis fans would enjoy the album, and that the opposite was also true as it may appeal to those not fond of Isis' work. He was critical of much of the material, but saved special praise for Justin Broadrick's rendition of "Hym", arguing that it represents a “coda [which] adds a bit of last-minute revelation” to the piece.

Track listing

Personnel 

Band members
 Jeff Caxide – bass guitar (original)
 Aaron Harris – drums (original)
 Michael Gallagher – guitar (original)
 Bryant Clifford Meyer – electronics and guitar (original)
 Aaron Turner – vocals, guitar, design (original); design

Other personnel
 Matt Bayles – audio engineering, audio mixing and production
 Aaron Funk – additional production/manipulation
 Swarmbots – additional production/manipulation
 Christian Fennesz – additional production/manipulation
 Nick Zampiello – mastering
 Maria Christopher – vocals (original)
 Ayal Naor – guitar and samples (original)

Release history

References

External links 
 Oceanic Remixes/Reinterpretations at Bandcamp (streamed copy where licensed)

Isis (band) albums
Albums produced by Matt Bayles
Albums with cover art by Aaron Turner
2004 remix albums
Hydra Head Records remix albums
Robotic Empire remix albums